Ebenezer Kingsbury Hunt (often called E. K. Hunt) (August 26, 1810 - May 2, 1889) was a prominent physician in Hartford, Connecticut.

Early life
Ebenezer Kingsbury Hunt was born in Coventry, Connecticut.  Hunt's parents were Dr. Eleazar Hunt (1786-1867) and Sybil (née Pomeroy) Hunt (1789-1876).

He was educated in the schools of Middletown, Connecticut and Amherst, Massachusetts and graduated from Yale College in 1833, where he was a member of the Linonian Society. He studied medicine at the Jefferson Medical College, Philadelphia, receiving his M.D. in 1838.

Career
Hunt became a prominent physician in Hartford, President of the Connecticut State Medical Society in 1864 and 1865, director and medical visitor of the Connecticut Retreat for the Insane (now called The Institute of Living), and physician to the Asylum for the Deaf and Dumb (now called the American School for the Deaf).

Personal life

On June 13, 1848, he married Mary A. Crosby (1826–1893), a daughter of Daniel P. Crosby of Hartford. Together, Ebenezer and Mary were the parents of four children, including:

 Louise Hunt, who married J. Benjamin Dimmick (1858–1920).
 Jeannette Hunt, who married George Goodwin Williams.
 Sarah Crosby Hunt (1849–1853), who died young.
 Mary Sibyl Hunt (1852–1855), who died young.

Hunt died in Hartford on May 2, 1889.

Legacy
The E. K. Hunt Chair (i.e., Professorship) of Anatomy at Yale University is named after him.

Published works
  Concerning the American psychiatrist Amariah Brigham
  (Sumner was Professor of Botany at Washington College in 1829 and President of the Connecticut State Medical Society in 1849)
 
  A reprint of the 1845 book.

See also

Psychiatric hospital
History of psychiatric institutions

References

External links
 
Connecticut State Medical Society
 

1810 births
1889 deaths
Yale College alumni
People from Hartford, Connecticut
Physicians from Connecticut
Jefferson Medical College alumni